Crusoe may refer to:

Art, entertainment, and media
 Crusoe (film), a 1989 film by Caleb Deschanel based on the novel Robinson Crusoe
 Crusoe (TV series), a 2008 television series based on the novel Robinson Crusoe
 Crusoe the Dachshund, internet celebrity
 Crusoe, a creature featured in the 2007 film The Water Horse: Legend of the Deep

People 
 Celina Crusoe (born 1974), Argentine volleyball player
 Lewis Crusoe, automobile executive
 Crusoe Kuningbal (1922–1984), Aboriginal Australian artist
 Crusoe Kurddal (born 1960/1961), Aboriginal Australian artist

Other
 Transmeta Crusoe, a computer processor family by Transmeta Corporation

See also
 Robinson Crusoe (disambiguation)
 Cruso (disambiguation)